The Nokia 7710 is a smartphone developed by Nokia and announced on 2 November 2004. It was the first Nokia device with a touchscreen (4 years ahead of Nokia 5800 XpressMusic), and first Nokia branded device with 2:1 aspect ratio display (14 years ahead of Nokia 7 Plus) . The 7710 is based on the Nokia 7700 which was never released. It is Nokia's only smartphone to run the Series 90 interface atop Symbian OS v7.0s.

Features
Compatible with GSM/HSCSD/GPRS/EDGE 900/1800/1900 MHz networks, the 7710 features a wide, touch-screen colour LCD with a resolution of 640 x 320 pixels and 16-bit colour depth, which also boasts a special power save mode activating only 640 x 64 pixels of the display. It has 90 MB of internal memory supported by a 128 MB MultiMedia Card (MMC). The external memory can be upgraded up to 2 GB. 

Moreover, the Nokia 7710 also offers multiple-format video recording courtesy of its integrated digital camera, supporting QCIF resolution at 17 frame/s in MPEG4, H.263 and Real Video 8 formats - for which the device also supports full-screen playback at 15 frame/s. Additionally, a music player supports MP3, AAC, RealAudio 7 and 8, WAV, MIDI and AMR formats, whilst picture viewing is also in place with support for JPEG, GIF, WBMP, BMP, MBM and PNG formats.

Due to pilot projects in some select areas there also exists 7710 phones which contain an optional DVB-H tuner module. DVB-H wouldn't be complete for the consumer market until the Nokia N92 exactly a year after the 7710.

Considering the particularity of this model (big screen, without keys, touch screen), the Italian subsidiary of Nokia decided to arrange creative brainstorming to find a use for this phone "completely new". It was sold along with a satellite receiver and has been used as the first satellite navigation system on a touch screen mobile phone in the world.

Specifications

References

External links 
 Full Spec By Nokia Developer
 Full Spec By GSMArena
 Review by GSMArena
 Review by Mobile-Review
 Image of the phone

Nokia smartphones
Symbian devices